Aloe mawii is an aloe widespread in south-east Tanzania, Malawi and northern Mozambique.

Aloe mawii grows tall, stout stems of up to 2 meters in height, though acaulescent forms can occur.

The stems sometimes branch higher up, in a tree-like form.

The leaves are up to 10 cm wide, spreading or recurved, with widely spaced teeth on their margins. They are blue-green in the shade, but can become reddish in full sun.

The flowers are orange-red, born on very short pedicels (1-2mm), on a simple, hardly branched inflorescence, which spreads out horizontally.

References

 The Plant List entry

mawii
Flora of Tanzania
Flora of Mozambique
Flora of Malawi